Andreas Zingerle (born 25 November 1961) is an Italian former biathlete. At the 1988 Olympics in Calgary, Zingerle won a bronze medal in the relay. At the World Championships Zingerle accumulated one individual gold medal and three golds and a bronze in relay and team events.

He has later become the head coach of Italian National Team. Under his tenure the Italians collected several medals at the Olympic Winter Games and World Championships, including Gold Medals by Dominik Windisch and Dorothea Wierer at the Biathlon World Championships 2019. Wierer also won the 2018-19 Women's Overall World Cup.

Biathlon results
All results are sourced from the International Biathlon Union.

Olympic Games
1 medal (1 bronze)

World Championships
5 medals (4 gold, 1 bronze)

*During Olympic seasons competitions are only held for those events not included in the Olympic program.
**Team was added as an event in 1989.

Individual victories
4 victories (3 In, 1 Sp)

*Results are from UIPMB and IBU races which include the Biathlon World Cup, Biathlon World Championships and the Winter Olympic Games.

Further notable results
 1980: 3rd, Italian championships of biathlon, sprint
 1982: 1st, Italian championships of biathlon, sprint
 1983: 2nd, Italian championships of biathlon
 1986:
 1st, Italian championships of biathlon
 2nd, Italian championships of biathlon, sprint
 1987:
 1st, Italian championships of biathlon
 1st, Italian championships of biathlon, sprint
 1988:
 1st, Italian championships of biathlon
 3rd, Italian championships of biathlon, sprint
 1990:
 1st, Italian championships of biathlon, sprint
 2nd, Italian championships of biathlon
 1991: 1st, Italian championships of biathlon
 1992:
 1st, Italian championships of biathlon
 2nd, Italian championships of biathlon, sprint
 1995: 1st, Italian championships of biathlon, sprint

References

External links
 
 
 
 

1961 births
Living people
Italian male biathletes
People from Rasen-Antholz
Germanophone Italian people
Biathletes at the 1984 Winter Olympics
Biathletes at the 1988 Winter Olympics
Biathletes at the 1992 Winter Olympics
Biathletes at the 1994 Winter Olympics
Olympic biathletes of Italy
Medalists at the 1988 Winter Olympics
Olympic medalists in biathlon
Olympic bronze medalists for Italy
Biathlon World Championships medalists
Sportspeople from Südtirol